The Pinallon Line or Vinylon Line is an electrified, freight-only industrial railway line of the Korean State Railway in Hamhŭng, South Hamgyŏng, North Korea, running from Hamhung marshalling yard to Hŭngnam via the February 8 Vinylon Complex in Hŭngnam.

It runs parallel to the narrow-gauge Sŏho Line for most of its length.

History
The Pinallon Line was opened by the Korean State Railway in May 1961, when the February 8 Vinylon Complex was opened, as the existing narrow-gauge Sŏho Line was insufficient to meet the freight-hauling requirements of the industrial complex.

Services

With the narrow-gauge Sŏho Line handling the passenger traffic, primarily workers at the various industries located along the line, the Pinallon Line transports only the freight heading to and from the various industries located along the line.

These industries include:

 the February 8 Vinylon Complex (via Sŏngch'ŏngang and Pinallon stations),
 the Hŭngnam Pharmaceutical Factory (via Sŏngch'ŏngang Station),
 the Hŭngnam Silicate Brick Factory (via Sŏngch'ŏngang and Unjung stations),
 the Hamhŭng Thermal Power Plant (via Unjung Station),
 the Ryongsŏng Machine Complex (via Ryongsŏng Station),
 the Hŭngnam Smelter (via Ryongsŏng),
 Hŭngnam Port
 the Hŭngnam Fertiliser Complex (via Ryongsŏng and Hŭngnam stations),

as well as several other smaller enterprises.

Route 

A yellow background in the "Distance" box indicates that section of the line is not electrified.

References

Railway lines in North Korea
Standard gauge railways in North Korea